The International Association of Medical Translators and Writers and Related Sciences (acronym Tremédica) is an international organization devoted to the promotion of the professions related to medical translation.

Overview
Established in December 2005 in Washington, D.C. as a non-profit organization and currently registered in Barcelona, Spain, it has members from all the Spanish-speaking world.

This organization actively takes part in the organization of events relevant for the benefit of the linguistic aspects of the medical fields.

References

External links
Tremédica Official Website
English To Spanish Translation

Organisations based in Barcelona
Translation associations of Spain
2005 establishments in Washington, D.C.
Scientific organizations established in 2005